Argersinger v. Hamlin, 407 U.S. 25 (1972), is a United States Supreme Court decision holding that the accused cannot be subjected to actual imprisonment unless provided with counsel. Gideon v. Wainwright made the right to counsel provided in the Sixth Amendment applicable to the states through the Fourteenth Amendment.

Background
Jon Richard Argersinger was sentenced under Florida law to 90 days in jail for carrying a concealed weapon but was never represented by counsel. Hamlin was the local sheriff. Argersinger claimed his conviction was unconstitutional, but his case was dismissed by the Florida Supreme Court, who relied on Duncan v. Louisiana, which held that jury trials were not required for crimes with a sentence of less than six months. The Florida court claimed that since jury trials were not required for misdemeanors, then neither was counsel.

Supreme Court decision
The Supreme Court disagreed with the Florida courts and overturned the conviction. The Court held that a criminal defendant may not be actually imprisoned unless provided with counsel.

References
Steamer, Robert J. "Argersinger v. Hamlin", Academic American Encyclopedia, 1991 edition, vol. 2, p. 152

External links

United States Supreme Court cases
United States Sixth Amendment appointment of counsel case law
1972 in United States case law
United States Supreme Court cases of the Burger Court